Oaten is a surname. Notable people with the surname include:

Gemma Oaten (born 1984), English actress
Mark Oaten (born 1964), British politician
Max Oaten (born 1935), Australian rules footballer
Patrick Oaten, Canadian water polo coach

See also
Otten